Warwick County Courthouses, also known as the Warwick County Courthouse and Clerk's Office, is a historic courthouse and clerk's office located at Newport News, Virginia. The original courthouse was built in 1810, and is a one-story, three-room, T-shaped plan Federal-style brick building. It has a slate-covered gable roof and exterior end chimneys.  The building was later enlarged by a side and rear addition. The later courthouse was built in 1884, and is a two-story, Italianate style brick building.  It has a rectangular plan and a shallow metal-covered hipped roof with three shallow cross gables. It features a square wood bell cupola that rises above the central projecting bay.  Also on the property is a contributing Confederate monument dedicated in 1909.  The buildings housed county offices until 1958, when Warwick County, Virginia was annexed by Newport News.

It was listed on the National Register of Historic Places in 1988.

References

County courthouses in Virginia
Courthouses on the National Register of Historic Places in Virginia
Government buildings completed in 1810
Federal architecture in Virginia
Italianate architecture in Virginia
Buildings and structures in Newport News, Virginia
National Register of Historic Places in Newport News, Virginia